is a dam in the city of  Gero, Gifu Prefecture,  Japan on the middle reaches of the Hida River, which is part of the Kiso River system. The dam is a concrete gravity dam with a height of 23.0 meters. It was completed in 1938 by the Toho Electric Power Company as part of the pre-war Hida River Development Project and was taken over by the Chubu Electric Power Company from 1951. The dam was constructed exclusively for hydroelectric power generation and generates a maximum of 22,000 kilowatts at the Shimohara Power Station downstream of the dam. The dam is located with the borders of the Hida-Kisogawa Quasi-National Park.

Dams in Gifu Prefecture
Hydroelectric power stations in Japan
Dams completed in 1938
Gravity dams
Energy infrastructure completed in 1938
Gero, Gifu